MoonRise is a robotic mission concept to the south pole of the Moon. It was proposed in 2017 for NASA's New Frontiers program mission 4, but it was not selected. If funded and launched by another NASA opportunity, it would focus on the giant South Pole–Aitken basin (SPA basin) on the far side of the Moon between the Moon's South Pole and Aitken Crater, 16° south of the Moon's equator. This region is the oldest and deepest observable impact basin on the Moon and provides a window into the deep crust of the Moon and its history as a result. The basin is also among the largest recognized impact structures in the Solar System.

MoonRise was not selected for the third New Frontiers program mission 3, losing out to the OSIRIS-REx asteroid sample return mission, and it lost again in the 2017 competition for New Frontiers program mission 4.

Science objectives

MoonRise has the following objectives:
 Determine the impact chronology of the SPA basin
 Investigate processes associated with the formation of large impact basins
 Investigate the materials excavated from the deeper crust, and possibly the mantle, of the Moon within the SPA basin
 Determine rock types, distribution of thorium, and implications for the Moon's thermal evolution
 Sample and analyze basaltic rock and volcanic glass, which record the composition and chemical evolution of the Moon's far-side mantle beneath the SPA basin

Future prospects
MoonRise received Phase A funding out of the New Frontiers program. The study was one of three concepts to get  funding in 2010 to further develop the mission for the final selection, which was a  mission to launch in the late 2010s. The three semi-finalists were MoonRise, the OSIRIS-REx sample return mission, and the Venus In Situ Explorer mission.

Although MoonRise was passed over in favor of OSIRIS-REx in the 2011 selection, a South Pole–Aitken basin sample return mission remains part of the 2013–2022 Planetary Science Decadal Survey's recommendation for potential New Frontiers missions, and NASA's Planetary Science Division has expressed support for the Decadal Survey's recommendations.

See also
Origin of the Moon
Stardust, a 1999 cometary coma sample return mission

References

External links
MoonRise Fact Sheet

Sample return missions
Missions to the Moon
Proposed NASA space probes
New Frontiers program proposals